Come Away is a 2020 fantasy drama film directed by Brenda Chapman (in her live-action directional debut) and starring David Oyelowo, Anna Chancellor, Angelina Jolie, Clarke Peters, David Gyasi, with Gugu Mbatha-Raw, Michael Caine and Derek Jacobi. The film is a homage to the stories of Peter Pan and Alice's Adventures in Wonderland. The characters of those stories are siblings who try to help their parents overcome the death of their eldest son.

Come Away had its world premiere at the Sundance Film Festival on January 24, 2020 and was released in the United States on November 13, 2020, by Relativity Media and was released in the United Kingdom on December 18, 2020, by Signature Entertainment. It is Relativity's first theatrically released film since 2016's Masterminds.

Plot
A mother reads "The Stolen Child" by William Butler Yeats to her three children and recounts a story of three siblings; eldest David, middle child Alice and youngest Peter, who live with their parents: Jack and Rose Littleton. The children dwell in a house by a forest on the outskirts of London and let their imaginations run wild. Alice acts mature for her age in contrast to Peter who behaves like a feral child pretending to be various sorts of tribesmen and gods, regarding the local woods as his domain. Rose's sister Eleanor is requesting to sponsor David's education on the grounds of his intelligence (during one of their trips they discover an eagle feather and a downed boat, with the siblings wondering if they could get it sea worthy).

Tragedy strikes one day when David, while pretending to fight pirates during a storm, falls into the river, is struck by lightning and dies. The family copes in different ways; with Jack, a model maker, returning to his bad gambling habits and Rose intending to make a green felt hat that would have been David's birthday present (further problems arise when Jack's latest model boat is rejected for another version). Eleanor meanwhile shifts focusing her attention on Alice hoping to make her niece a proper lady in order to make her more accepted in the current class society due to her mixed-race parentage. In order to make payments Peter and Alice make a trip to London to sell a family heirloom silver pocket watch, during which they shelter a group of street urchins who have pickpocketed an intimidating criminal.

Both siblings meet an eccentric shop keeper, Hatter, who leads them to a money lender and lower crime boss Captain James or CJ who unknown to both of them is their uncle. Peter later runs into the very same street kids (he met earlier) who reveal they are known as the Lost Boys and that they have been to a place known only to children called Never Neverland and offer to take him there. Jack later visits his brother to call off his debt collectors, with a jealous James crippling his brother (as a show of loyalty to his crime pay masters) leading to Jack losing his hand.

Peter responds by seeking out these Lost Boys to help rob James of the fortune of gold coins he spied on earlier that James is safe guarding for the various criminal organizations of London's underworld. When James catches his nephew in the act Peter cuts his uncle's hand off in a sword duel before fleeing, with his uncle and cohorts hot on his heels, Peter is forced to run away from home taking his late brother's newly finished hat with the eagle feather in it while dressed in his brother's hand me down green clothes (whilst Captain James and company give chase after him). Alice last spies Peter on the now fixed boat sailing away crewed by said Lost Boys who are taking her brother to Never Neverland (with the ship apparently being pulled into the air by the wind itself thanks to a fairy that Alice came across disguised as a little brass bell). Although Peter briefly returns to stop by while his family sleeps to deposit some of the stolen coins (that he irregularly does over the years to support his loved ones).

The mother finishes telling her story which has now been established as being of her own childhood thereby revealing she is Alice now an adult to her children who are revealed to be Wendy Darling and her brothers, John and Michael. Coming back from going out for the evening with her husband George Darling, she suddenly hears a familiar crowing that both her brothers used to do and heads upstairs to find the children's bedroom windows thrown wide open and a notable eagle feather on the floor beneath said window. As she looks out of their window at the night sky hoping it was her brother who came to taken his niece and nephews off to this supposed Never Neverland, and will likely look after them while they are there.

Cast

Production
The project was announced in May 2016, with The Prince of Egypt and Brave co-director Brenda Chapman hired to direct.

In May 2018, Angelina Jolie and David Oyelowo were cast to play the parents of Alice and Peter, with both actors also taking producer roles. In August 2018, Anna Chancellor, Clarke Peters, Gugu Mbatha-Raw, Michael Caine, David Gyasi, Derek Jacobi and Jenny Galloway joined the cast. Additional financing came from Ace Pictures, Creasun Entertainment USA and Tin Res Entertainment; executive producers include David Haring, Minglu Ma, George Acogny, Timur Bekbosunov, Johnny Chang, Peter Wong, Emma Lee, Gia Muresan, Simon Fawcett and Steve Barnett.

Filming commenced at Shad Thames in London in August 2018, as well as Windsor Great Park in both the South Forest and around Johnson's pond. In October 2018, the production moved to Los Angeles before concluding later that month.

Release
It had its world premiere at the Sundance Film Festival on January 24, 2020. In October 2020, Relativity Media acquired U.S. distribution rights to the film and had its release on November 13, 2020.

Reception

Box office 
In its opening weekend the film grossed $108,000 from 475 theaters. The film earned $184,477 in the United States and Canada, $1,562,383 in other territories, for a total worldwide gross of $1,746,860.

Critical response
The website's critics consensus reads, "Largely lacking the fairytale magic it seeks to conjure, Come Away is an initially intriguing fantasy that never really takes flight." According to Metacritic, which sampled 17 critic reviews and calculated a weighted average score of 40 out of 100, the film received "mixed or average reviews".

After its Sundance premiere, Ben Pearson of Slash Film gave a positive review by stating "A new children's classic has arrived, and this timeless fairytale will surely enchant audiences for generations to come." John DeFore of The Hollywood Reporter gave a negative review by stating "A wealth of familiar storybook material and a cast including Angelina Jolie and David Oyelowo will draw attention, but a handsome production and beautiful cast aren't enough to get this fantasy off the ground." Conversely, Peter Bradshaw, writing in The Guardian, gave the film one star out of a possible five, describing it as "a muddled, leaden fantasy adventure for Christmas which feels as if someone put all the Quality Streets in a saucepan and melted them together, with the wrappers still on ... an indigestible lump of star turns, superstar cameos and references to classic children's literature".

References

External links
 

2020 films
2020 drama films
2020s fantasy drama films
American fantasy drama films
British fantasy drama films
Films based on Alice in Wonderland
Films directed by Brenda Chapman
Films scored by John Debney
Films shot in London
Films shot in Los Angeles
Magic realism films
Peter Pan films
2020 fantasy films
2020s English-language films
2020s American films
2020s British films